Sirens is an American comedy television series loosely based on the British series of the same name. The American version was adapted by actor Denis Leary and screenwriter Bob Fisher. The series aired for two seasons on the USA cable television network from March 6, 2014, through April 14, 2015. On April 22, 2015, USA cancelled Sirens after two seasons.

Overview
The series follows the workday of three  Emergency Medical Technicians with a fictional Chicago private ambulance company, named Eminent, and the unusual situations—often crude or humorous—people in need of their assistance are in.

Cast

Main
 Michael Mosley as Johnny "Mousse" Farrell: a Chicago paramedic whose fear of commitment contributes to an on-again/off-again relationship with Theresa
 Kevin Daniels as Henry Isaiah "Hank" St. Clare: Johnny's openly gay paramedic partner and lifelong friend
 Kevin Bigley as Brian Czyk: a new paramedic recruit
 Jessica McNamee as Theresa Kelly: a Chicago police patrol officer and Johnny's on-again/off-again girlfriend
 Bill Nunn as "Cash" (season 2, recurring previously), a Vietnam veteran EMT who enjoys Twix and had his name legally changed to Cassius Clay
 Josh Segarra as Billy Cepeda (season 2, recurring previously): Theresa's police officer partner

Recurring
 Kelly O'Sullivan as Valentina "Voodoo" Dunacci: an asexual EMT
 Maura Kidwell as Claire "Stats" Bender: an obsessive-compulsive EMT
 Kirsten Fitzgerald as Kathy "Mac" McMenimen: Day Shift Supervisor

Production
In June 2011, it was announced that Denis Leary and Bob Fisher were developing an adaptation of the 2011 British comedy-drama Sirens, created by Brian Fillis and inspired by Tom Reynolds's book, Blood, Sweat & Tea about the London Ambulance Service. Leary stated that he would not star in the series, but would take a small role, if necessary, in the future. In 2012, the USA Network sought to rush the developing Sirens to pilot status. However, a deal with Fox Television Studios was carefully being studied over VOD rights. The network was able to order a series pilot in June 2012.

The four lead roles were filled in October 2012, with the casting of Michael Mosley, Kevin Daniels, Kevin Bigley and Jessica McNamee. Production for the pilot began in Chicago that month. The network announced that Sirens would premiere in the first quarter of 2014 and would later state that two back-to-back episodes would air together on March 6, 2014, then resume normal programming the following week.

At the January 2014 TCA conference, Leary and Fisher stated that the producers of the British series approached Leary's business partner, Jim Serpico, and asked him to adapt it for the U.S.. Leary stated, "We really liked those guys, and USA [network] was pillaging the cast of [the recently ended] Rescue Me and putting them into shows." He added, "we can make some money off these USA people."

On June 11, 2014, USA ordered a 13-episode second season of Sirens.

Episodes

Season 1 (2014)

Season 2 (2015)

Critical reception
Sirens scored 61 out of 100 on Metacritic based on 19 "generally favorable" reviews. On another review aggregator site, Rotten Tomatoes, it holds a 73% rating with an average rating of 6.3 out of 10, based on 22 reviews.

References

External links

2014 American television series debuts
2015 American television series endings
2010s American LGBT-related comedy television series
2010s American medical television series
2010s American single-camera sitcoms
2010s American workplace comedy television series
American television series based on British television series
Asexuality in fiction
English-language television shows
Television series by 20th Century Fox Television
Television shows set in Chicago
USA Network original programming